Leslie Mitchell may refer to:
 Leslie Mitchell (historian), English historian
 Leslie Mitchell (broadcaster) (1905–1985), British broadcaster and newsreel commentator
 Les Mitchell, see List of Melbourne Football Club players
 Leslie R. Mitchell

See also
 James Leslie Mitchell (1901–1935), Scottish writer better known by his pen name of Lewis Grassic Gibbon